Wheeling Township is one of the nineteen townships of Guernsey County, Ohio, United States. As of the 2010 census the population was 686, down from 752 at the 2000 census.

Geography
Located in the northwestern corner of the county, it borders the following townships:
Oxford Township, Tuscarawas County - north
Washington Township, Tuscarawas County - northeast corner
Monroe Township - east
Liberty Township - southeast
Knox Township - southwest
Linton Township, Coshocton County - west
Oxford Township, Coshocton County - northwest

No municipalities are located in Wheeling Township.

Name and history
Wheeling Township was established in 1810. Statewide, the only other Wheeling Township is located in Belmont County.

Government
The township is governed by a three-member board of trustees, who are elected in November of odd-numbered years to a four-year term beginning on the following January 1. Two are elected in the year after the presidential election and one is elected in the year before it. There is also an elected township fiscal officer, who serves a four-year term beginning on April 1 of the year after the election, which is held in November of the year before the presidential election. Vacancies in the fiscal officership or on the board of trustees are filled by the remaining trustees.

References

External links
County website

Townships in Guernsey County, Ohio
Townships in Ohio